Nikola Gavov (born 19 March 1999) is a Bulgarian footballer who currently plays as a midfielder for Botev Vratsa.

Career

Beroe Stara Zagora 
In the summer of 2016 he moved from Litex Lovech to Beroe Stara Zagora. He made his official debut for the team on 11 May 2017 against Neftochimic.

In June 2018, Gavov was sent on loan to Second League club Montana.

Career statistics

Club

References

External links
 

1999 births
Living people
People from Kotel, Bulgaria
Bulgarian footballers
Bulgaria youth international footballers
Association football midfielders
PFC Beroe Stara Zagora players
FC Montana players
FC Minyor Radnevo players
First Professional Football League (Bulgaria) players
Second Professional Football League (Bulgaria) players